Harwell is a surname. Notable people with the surname include:

Corey Harwell, American neuroscientist
David W. Harwell (born 1932), American judge
Ernie Harwell (1918–2010), American sportscaster
Jack Harwell, sheriff of McLennan County, Texas
Jeff Harwell (born 1986), American soccer player 
Steve Harwell (born 1967), American singer and musician